was a Japanese writer and critic from Azumino, Nagano prefecture.

Usui won the 1974 10th Tanizaki Prize for Azumino (安曇野). 

In 1977 he published a novelised account of Kawabata's death that led to a law-suit against him by the Nobel Prize-winner's family.

Selected works 
 Hōjōki. Tsurezuregusa. Ichigon hōdanshu (方丈記. 徒然草. 一言 芳談集), Tōkyō : Chikuma Shobō, 1970.
 Hitotsu no kisetsu, 1975.
 Butai no ue de, 1976.
 Genjitsu no gyoshi, Tōkyo : Ie no Hikari Kyokai, 1976.
 Tsuchi to furusato no bungaku zenshū, 15 volumes, 1976-1977.
 Jikō no tenmatsu (事故のてんまつ), 1977.
 Jibun o tsukuru (自分 を つくる), Tōkyō : Chikuma Shobō, 1979.
 Shohan (初版), Tōkyō : Chikuma Shobō, 1985.

References

Japanese writers
1905 births
1987 deaths